The night snake (Hypsiglena torquata) is a species of rear-fanged colubrid. It is found in Mexico.

Morphology and physiology

Description
Total length is 12–26  in (30–66 cm). It is pale gray, light brown, or beige in color, with dark grey or brown blotches on the back and sides. The night snake's head is rather flat and triangular-shaped and usually has a pair of dark brown blotches on the neck. It also has a black or dark brown bar behind the eyes that contrast against the white or pale gray upper labial scales, and the pupil of the eye is vertical. The belly is white or yellowish. Females are usually longer and heavier than males.

Venom

Although the night snake poses no threat to humans, it is slightly venomous and uses this venom to subdue its prey.

Distribution and habitat

The night snake is endemic to Mexico. Not much is known as far as population densities and exact range due to the highly cryptic nature of the night snake.

Ecology

Behavior
Night snakes are known to be both crepuscular (most active at dawn and dusk), and nocturnal. They are usually seen at night while crossing roads, but can be found under rocks, boards, dead branches and other surface litter during the day. Night snakes hibernate during the winter months, and are known to aestivate during periods of the summer. They are generally most active from April to October, with peaks of activity usually occurring in June. If threatened, the night snake may coil up and thrust its coils at the threat, while flattening its head into a triangular defensive shape.

Diet
Their main prey is lizards. A study in southwestern Idaho found that the night snake's diet consisted mostly of side-blotched lizards (Uta stansburiana) and their eggs. Other prey includes juvenile rattlesnakes and blind snakes, salamanders, frogs, and large insects.

Reproduction
Night snakes mate in the spring, and females lay a clutch of 2–9 eggs from April to August. Eggs hatch in 7 to 8 weeks, usually in late summer. Males reach sexual maturity after one year.

In captivity

Night snakes are known to be docile and easily handled. Captive night snakes have lived over 12 years.

References

Further reading
 Behler JL, King FW. 1979. The Audubon Society Field Guide to North American Reptiles and Amphibians. New York: Alfred A. Knopf. 743 pp. . (Hypsiglena torquata, pp. 616–617 + Plate 586).
 Boulenger GA. 1894. Catalogue of the Snakes in the British Museum (Natural History). Volume II., Containing the Conclusion of the Colubridæ Aglyphæ. London: Trustees of the British Museum (Natural History). (Taylor and Francis, printers). xi + 382 pp. + Plates I- XX. (Hypsiglena torquata, p. 210; see also H. ochrorhynchus, pp. 209–210, and H. affinis, pp. 210–211 + Plate VIII, Figure 1).
 Conant R. 1975. A Field Guide to Reptiles and Amphibians of Eastern and Central North America, Second Edition. Boston: Houghton Mifflin. xviii + 429 pp.  (hardcover),  (paperback). (Hypsiglena torquata, pp. 217–218 + Plate 33 + Map 170).
 Conant R, Bridges W. 1939. What Snake Is That? A Field Guide to the Snakes of the United States East of the Rocky Mountains. (With 108 drawings by Edmond Malnate). New York and London: D. Appleton-Century. Frontispiece map + viii + 163 pp. + Plates A-C, 1–32. (Leptodeira torquata ochrorhyncha, pp. 128–129 + Plate 25, Figure 74).
 Günther A. 1860. Description of Leptodeira torquata, a new Snake from Central America. Ann. Mag. Nat. Hist., Third Series 5: 168–170 + Plate X., Figure A.
 Schmidt KP, Davis DD. 1941. Field Book of Snakes of the United States and Canada. New York: G.P. Putnam's Sons. 365 pp. (Hypsiglena ochrorhyncha, pp. 259–260, Figure 84 + Plate 29, center, on p. 349).
 Smith HM, Brodie ED Jr. 1982. Reptiles of North America: A Guide to Field Identification. New York: Golden Press. 240 pp. . (Hypsiglena torquata, pp. 176–177).
 Stebbins, RC. 2003. A Field Guide to Western Reptiles and Amphibians, Third Edition.  The Peterson Field Guide Series. Boston and New York: Houghton Mifflin. xiii + 533 pp. . (Hypsiglena torquata, pp. 403–404 + Plate 46 + Map 180).
 Wright AH, Wright AA. 1957. Handbook of Snakes of the United States and Canada. Ithaca and London: Comstock. 1,105 pp. (in 2 volumes). (Genus Hypsiglena, pp. 314–317, Map 30; species Hypsiglena torquata, pp. 318–330, Figures 97–101).

External links

Hypsiglena
Reptiles described in 1860
Taxa named by Albert Günther
Reptiles of Mexico
Endemic fauna of Mexico